The Leprechaun is the independently released debut album by rapper Lil' Flip. It featured the hit single "I Can Do Dat". It has sold over 200,000 copies and was an underground hit. A sequel to the album was released in 2020 titled The Leprechaun 2.

Track listing

Bonus Disc

Notes
The original pressing of the album included the track "#5 Realest Rhymin" featuring E.S.G. & Slim Thug.

Chart performance

References

2000 debut albums
Lil' Flip albums